Stock Township may refer to the following places:

In Canada

 Stock Township, Cochrane District, Ontario

In the United States

 Stock Township, Harrison County, Ohio
 Stock Township, Noble County, Ohio

See also

 Stock (disambiguation)

Township name disambiguation pages